is a fictional character from Square Enix's Final Fantasy series. She was introduced as the female protagonist, and one of the main playable characters of the 2001 role-playing video game Final Fantasy X. She appears as a summoner embarking on a journey to defeat the world-threatening monster, Sin, alongside her companions, including the male protagonist, Tidus. Yuna reappears in Final Fantasy X-2, where she becomes the protagonist, searching for a way to find Tidus two years after his disappearance. Other Square Enix games have featured Yuna, notably Dissidia 012 Final Fantasy.

Tetsuya Nomura based Yuna's overall design on hakama, but also wanted to give her outfit something that would flow and so gave her a furisode. Nomura said that her name means "night" in the Okinawan language, which contrasts with Tidus's name, which is Okinawan for "sun". For X-2, the game's staff wanted Tetsu Tsukamoto to redesign her costume to reflect her personality and the game's atmosphere.

Many media critics and fans received Yuna's character well, particularly praised Yuna for her story in the first game and her relationship with Tidus, and her characterization. Despite the critical reception, there was a mixed reception for her role in X-2 due to her redesign and asthethics involving her changed personality.

Appearances
In Final Fantasy X, Yuna is introduced as a summoner from the world of Spira who can control creatures known as aeons with help from spirits known as Fayths. Daughter the late High Summoner Braska, who destroyed the menaching Sin ten years earlier, Yuna embarks on a quest to defeat Sin with her Guardians, Lulu and Wakka. Yuna must journey to temples across the world, acquire the aeon from each and summon the Final Aeon in a battle that will kill them both. In the meantime, she is j She gradually becomes more open and falls in love with her guardian Tidus as both often talk about their pasts and aspires to see home, Zanarkand. Upon arriving at the place where Yuna can summon the final aeon, Tidus persuades the group to look for another way to defeat Sin without using any sacrifices. After entering Sin's body, Tidus is forced to kill Braska's Aeon, his father Jecht, and Sin is later destroyed by the destruction of the disembodied spirit of Yu Yevon, who is responsible for reviving Sin after each defeat, allowing an eternal Calm to start in Spira. However, Tidus disappears as he is the product of the Fayth, who could not depart until Sin's defeat and has a sad separation from her. In the international version of the game, Yuna finds a blurry video of a man she believes to be Tidus and decides to go on a quest to find him.

In the game's international version, the Gullwings go their separate ways before the game's opening, with Yuna returning to Besaid Island. The trio then reunites to explore a newfound tower. In X-2, Yuna journeys to Spira in search of the truth behind a sphere containing a video featuring a man resembling Tidus in prison. During her journey, Yuna discovers the man from the sphere was actually Shuyin, a spirit who wishes to destroy Spira in revenge for the death of his lover, Lenne. Yuna possesses a sphere from Lenne that allows her to replicate here singing and wishes to stop Shuyin's revenge. With the help of Paine's former comrades, the Gullwings defeat Shuyin, who departs to the afterlife with Lenne's spirit sealed in the sphere Yuna kept. Depending on the player's progress throughout the game, the Fayth may revive Tidus so that she can reunite with him. The game's HD Remastered version adds a new audio drama where Yuna becomes a part of the group called Yevoners, whose main temple is on Besaid. In the story, she breaks up with Tidus after telling him she loves somebody else before declaring she will fight the revived Sin once again.

She also appears in Dissidia 012 Final Fantasy, an action game that features several Final Fantasy characters, as one of the characters to be summoned by the goddess Cosmos to participate in a war against her rival, Chaos. For this game, Yuna appears in her Final Fantasy X form, but slightly arranged to fit with the game's cast. Yuna retains her memories from X and tries to make Tidus join her cast only for him to be wounded by The Emperor on his attempt to kill Yuna. Yuna is later killed by the mannekins alongside other Cosmos' soldiers in the end of the 012 narrative. Additionally, she has an alternative design based on Yoshitaka Amano's illustration, and a wedding dress from FFX. Her X-2 regular form was made available as downloadable content.  She also appears in Dissidia NT as a warrior summoned by Cosmos's heir apparent, Materia, to take part in a war with her rival, Spiritus. However, Yuna is one of many characters summoned far away from the war and arrives well after its completion.

Outside the Final Fantasy series, Yuna appears in Kingdom Hearts II as a pixie along with Paine and Rikku. Bribed by Maleficent into spying on Leon's resistance group from Radiant Garden, the pixies eventually switch sides after being abandoned by the witch and told of Sora's cause. Yuna is also featured in the board game style video game Itadaki Street Special, appearing alongside Auron and Tidus, and represents Final Fantasy X in the rhythm game Theatrhythm Final Fantasy.

Multiple figures and figurines of Yuna were produced by various manufacturers, including a 2001 figure by Square. A 2003 audio CD Final Fantasy X-2 Vocal Collections features performances by Mayuko Aoki, Marika Matsumoto and Megumi Toyoguchi, the voice actresses for Yuna, Rikku and Paine, respectively. Yonekichi Nakamura portrays Yuna in the 2023 kabuki play adaptation of Final Fantasy X.

Creation and development
According to Tetsuya Nomura, he based Yuna's overall design on hakama, a type of traditional Japanese clothing. Nomura said that after learning Yuna was to perform a dance called the "sending", he wanted to give her outfit something that would flow. For this reason, the specific type of kimono he chose for her was a furisode, a long-sleeved kimono. Nomura also said that he adorned Yuna's dress and necklace with images of the hibiscus flower also called "yuna" and that her name carries the meaning of "night" (夕な) in Okinawan, establishing a contrast between her and the lead male protagonist of Final Fantasy X, Tidus, whose Japanese name (ティーダ) translates to "sun" (太陽) in Okinawan. This contrast is also represented in-game by items named for the sun and moon that empower Tidus' and Yuna's most powerful weapons. Nomura explains that while all these subtle details may be unneeded, he wanted his designs to have meaning behind them.

The positive fan reaction of FFX convinced the developers to continue Yuna's story and those of other characters with Final Fantasy X-2. Costume designer Tetsu Tsukamoto said that Yuna's radical design changes from one game to the other reflected a huge cultural change. Producer Yoshinori Kitase added that they did not want to make X-2 feel like an extension of its predecessor, so they changed the clothing of Yuna, Rikku, and others' to make them seem more active. They accomplished this before creating the story and setting. Because Yuna, Rikku, and Paine live in a more carefree world, the designers wanted them to dress up, a feature that became key to the gameplay. Scenario writer Kazushige Nojima described her new outfit as a "natural reaction to the heavy stuff she wore in FFX". Yuna's singing performance was used to demonstrate the pop feel that the game incorporates. Final Fantasy X director Motomu Toriyama said her personality was the result of not having her bear the responsibility of being a summoner anymore. He added that while "she could be seen as a completely different person, ... deep in her heart, she is the same old Yuna".

In the games' Japanese versions, Yuna has been voiced by Mayuko Aoki. Hedy Burress provides the character's voice in the English adaptations. Voicing Yuna, Burress remembers trying to translate Yuna's duty, respect, and honor and wanting to retain the gentleness and femininity of her character. When commenting on how the audiences would react to Final Fantasy X, Burress said that she wanted them to participate in the game itself and "transport them into a completely different world" through the voices.

Reception
Yuna received positive critical acclaim for her appearance in Final Fantasy X. Chris Reiter of Gaming Target ranked her as the third best "PlayStation 2 babe", describing her as "the star heroine whose soft features, kindness, and her unique story makes her one of the better beauties to love". In 2008, Chip ranked her as the 13th top "girl of gaming". In 2012, Larry Hester of Complex ranked the original version of Yuna as the 20th "hottest" video game character yet. That same year, Heath Hooker of GameZone ranked Yuna the ninth top Final Fantasy character, calling her "one of the strongest female characters in the entire Final Fantasy franchise" and stating that "the depth of character Yuna presents to the player is unfathomable and is one reason why she lands on this list". In 2013, Complex editors Michael Rougeau and Gus Turner listed Yuna at number 21 on the list of the greatest heroines in video game history. The same publication later ranked Yuna as the sixth greatest Final Fantasy character of all time. However, PSU.com retrospectively called Yuna an underrated character and stated that she was overlooked due to Auron and Rikku.

GamesRadar listed Yuna as one of the 25 best new characters of the 2000s, describing the romance between her and Tidus as "legendary" and Yuna herself as compassionate, generous and dutiful. Yuna and Tidus were included on the list of "great loves" by Matthew Rorie of GameSpot in 2006, while AJ Glasser of GamesRadar in 2008 listed them as the second best Square Enix couple. Their kiss scene was declared as number two best in video games by Lisa Foiles of The Escapist, and Yuna's abortive wedding with Seymour was also ranked as the third memorable matrimony in the history of PlayStation by Official PlayStation Magazine in 2014.

Yuna's design change in Final Fantasy X-2 received a mixed reception. Rob Wright of Tom's Hardware included her among the 50 greatest female characters in video game history. Jeremy Dunham of IGN praised the clothing designs, combining "proven and recognizable Final Fantasy styles" with a "revealing neo-modern fashion sense", referencing her warrior costume as a stand-out, and also said that English voice actress Hedy Burress' performance sounded more comfortable as opposed to the previous game. Brad Shoemaker of GameSpot praised Burress' voice acting, saying that it brought her fully to life in accordance with the other changes in the character. The book Packaging Girlhood: Rescuing Our Daughters from Marketers' Schemes described Yuna's appearance as being a "sexy MTV video star", adding that it is a "lesson to girls that being brave, strong, and ready to fight can only last so long – the next adventure is fashion, boyfriends, and sex". GameSpy's Raymond "Psylancer" Padilla called her "the video-game vixen of my dreams". Christian Nutt, also of GameSpy, described Burress' portrayal of Yuna in X-2 as superb. Various publications compared Yuna to other fictional characters, including the Charlie's Angelss Natalie Cook as portrayed by Cameron Diaz; and Tomb Raider star Lara Croft, due to her attire and gun-wielding skills. In 2008, GameDaily listed the Final Fantasy X-2 incarnation of Yuna as one of the top 50 hottest video game women, praising her revealing outfit as well as her alternate costumes. That same year, she was ranked as the tenth on top Final Fantasy character by IGN, commenting that while her original appearance made her "fine eye-candy" and her sending scene was one of the best works by the CG studio Square Visual Works, it was the sequel that gave her more confidence and attitude, as well as "a gratuitously exploitative costume that ranks among the series' finest bits of fanboy-baiting".

Negative response focused on the character's revealing clothes and singer areas which produced backlash enough from gamers to avoid labeling as an actual Final Fantasy game in contrast to previous more fitting heroes. GameSpot felt that while her character feels rewritten, the caring parts from Yuna remain intact, but still felt the costumes were too skimpy. Having criticized Hedy Burress's acting in the original game to the point that gamers feel the need of hearing to the Japanese actress, Eurogamer thought that the actress improved her work, but felt that Yuna's characterization might come across as too cheesy not only due to the usage of her as a singer involving Jpop most notably the Spice Girls. Similarly, GameSpy praised the improvement of Burress despite noticing poorlsyching. Yuna's quest to Tidus was noted to be a strong narrative to motivate players but he felt such potential was lost as Square instead focused the plot on a series of sidequests which lack appeal. Gaming Age negatively compared the Gullwings with the film Charlie's Angels, panning the former for making as entire game unbearable especially when Yuna starts singing. Despite having mixed feelings about Yuna's traits from X-2, Fanbyte panned Yuna's characterization from the audio drama Will for going back to her original persona, undoing any type of character arc the character went through.

The character also gained a significant and enduring popularity among the gamer public, especially in Japan. Readers of Game Informer voted Yuna's relationship with Tidus as the best of 2001. Yuna was voted the 10th most popular video game character in Japan in a 2008 Oricon poll, as well as 16th in a similar poll by Famitsu 2010. In a 2010 ASCII Media Works poll in which Japanese fans would vote whose video game or manga character would like to name their children after, Yuna came second in the female category. In official Square Enix polls, Yuna was voted the third most commonly favorite female Final Fantasy character in 2013 and the most popular Final Fantasy heroine in 2014. Yuna also placed 2nd in a NHK Grand Poll in 2020.

See also
 Characters of Final Fantasy X and X-2

References

External links

 Yuna at the Final Fantasy Wiki

Characters designed by Tetsuya Nomura
Dancer characters in video games
Female characters in video games
Fictional bounty hunters
Fictional characters with heterochromia
Fictional characters granted magic or power through dealings
Fictional characters with evocation or summoning abilities
Fictional explorers in video games
Fictional female religious workers
Fictional female gunfighters
Fictional fairies and sprites
Fictional marksmen and snipers
Fictional priests and priestesses
Fictional shamans
Fictional spiritual mediums
Fictional wandfighters
Final Fantasy characters
Final Fantasy X
Musician characters in video games
Orphan characters in video games
Religious worker characters in video games
Fictional gunfighters in video games
Science fantasy video game characters
Singer characters in video games
Square Enix protagonists
Teenage characters in video games
Video game characters introduced in 2001
Video game characters who use magic